Jasmine Walker (born February 3, 1998) is an American professional basketball player for the Seattle Storm of the Women's National Basketball Association (WNBA). She previously played for the College side Alabama Crimson Tide women's basketball.

High school career
Walker attended Jefferson Davis High School where in her senior year in 2015–16, she averaged 19.3 ppg. and 7.9 rpg. to help her school to a 25–6 record and the 7A state title. She scored 18 points in the state championship win against McGill-Toolen High School. She was named the 2016 Gatorade State Player of the Year, the 2016 USA Today Alabama Player of the Year and was also part of the 2016 All-Alabama first team.

College career
Walker started her college career at the Florida State Seminoles women's basketball team in 2016, where she played just five games and had a season high of 14 points in a game against Winthrop Eagles women's basketball team. She moved to Alabama Crimson Tide women's basketball team. In her Senior Season, she averaged 19.1 points and 9.4 rebounds in 27 games in her senior season. She shot 39.8% from the 3-point line.

Florida State and Alabama statistics
Source

Professional career

WNBA
On April 15, 2021, the Los Angeles Sparks selected Walker as the 7th pick in the 2021 WNBA Draft.

Walker was traded to the Connecticut Sun in January of 2023. On February 16,she was released by the Sun.

On February 24, Walker signed a training camp contract with the Seattle Storm.

WNBA Career Stats

Regular Season

|-
| style='text-align:left;'|2021
| style='text-align:left;'|Los Angeles
| 2 || 0 || 10.0 || .000 || .000 || .000 || 0.5 || 1.0 || 1.0 || 0.5 || 0.5 || 0.0
|-
| style='text-align:left;'|2022
| style='text-align:left;'|Los Angeles
| 32 || 1 || 8.8 || .250 || .200 || 1.000 || 1.5 || 0.2 || 0.2 || 0.1 || 0.5 || 1.6
|-
| style='text-align:left;'| Career
| style='text-align:left;'| 2 years, 1 team
| 34 || 0 || 108.90 || .235 || .185 || .600 || 1.4 || 0.2 || 0.2 || 0.1 || 0.5 || 1.5

References

1998 births
Living people
21st-century African-American sportspeople
African-American basketball players
Alabama Crimson Tide women's basketball players
American women's basketball players
Basketball players from Montgomery, Alabama
Florida State Seminoles women's basketball players
Los Angeles Sparks draft picks
Los Angeles Sparks players
Power forwards (basketball)
21st-century African-American women